The Rose and Crown is a former pub at 8 Stroudley Walk, Bow, London E3.

It is a Grade II listed building, dating back to the late 18th/early 19th century. The pub was originally called the Bowling Green Inn as it was opposite the village bowling green.

It closed as a pub in 2007, and is now the RSA Cash & Carry store.

References

External links
 

Grade II listed pubs in London
Former pubs in London
Grade II listed buildings in the London Borough of Tower Hamlets
Pubs in the London Borough of Tower Hamlets